The following is a list of awards and nominations for  Johnnie To, a critically acclaimed Hong Kong filmmaker.

Main awards and nominations

Festivals

External links

To, Johnnie